Paul Gosling (born 7 September 1948) is a retired English professional darts player.

Darts career
Gosling reached the final of the 1969 Swedish Open, losing to Barry Twomlow. 1969 saw Gosling get to another major final losing in the News of the World Darts Championship. He then reached the final again of the 1974 News of the World Darts Championship. Gosling reached the semi-finals without dropping a single leg and defeated Joe Givnan in the semi finals before losing to Peter Chapman. Gosling reached the quarter finals of the 1979 Winmau World Masters, beating Billy Mateer before losing to Barry Done.

Gosling played in the 1980 BDO World Darts Championship, losing in the first round to Cliff Lazarenko. He returned a year later for the 1981 BDO World Darts Championship but lost in the first round to Tony Brown.

World Championship Results

BDO
1980: 1st round (lost to Cliff Lazarenko 0-2)
1981: 1st round (lost to Tony Brown 1-2)

Career finals

Independent major finals: 2 (2 runners-up)

External links
Profile and stats on Darts Database
Profile and stats on Dartsmad

Sportspeople from Cornwall
English darts players
Living people
British Darts Organisation players
1948 births